Class 270 (later reclassified as Class 70) locomotives were the first diesel shunters used by NMBS/SNCB. Three were initially ordered as prototypes of diesel-electric traction. Three diesel-hydraulic Class 271 locomotives were also ordered for comparison.

One loco, 7005, has been preserved by PFT at Saint Ghislain; the others were scrapped after being replaced by class 77s.

History
Built by Belgian locomotive manufacturers Baume & Marpent, the 6 class 270 locomotives were initially allocated to Ronet depot, near Namur. Their electric transmission was produced by ACEC, under licence from Westinghouse. During 1992, 7004 acquired a Cockerill diesel engine to replace its original Anglo Belgian Corporation unit.

After Ronet, during 1961 they were moved on to Antwerp to perform trip workings to and from places such as Boom, Mechelen, Mol and Turnhout.  When, at the start of 1971, NMBS/SNCB adopted their current numbering system they became Class 70.

References

Bo′Bo′ locomotives
National Railway Company of Belgium locomotives
Railway locomotives introduced in 1954
Standard gauge locomotives of Belgium
Diesel-electric locomotives of Belgium